The San Gabriel slender salamander (Batrachoseps gabrieli) is a species of salamander. It has a worm-like body, a large head and large limbs, and an elongate cylindrical tail of less than 1.5 times its body length. An adult salamander is between 3 and 5 cm long. It has a black dorsum with white, coppery, and orange blotches, and an immaculate black venter. It may have red spots on tail.

B. gabrieli is similar to the related species B. pacificus and B. nigriventis.

This species is only known from the San Gabriel Canyon system, and typically lives above 1,000 meters in the San Gabriel Mountains of Los Angeles County.

References

 This article is based on a description from "A Field Guide to the Reptiles and Amphibians of Coastal Southern California", Robert N. Fisher and Ted J. Case, USGS, http://www.werc.usgs.gov/fieldguide/index.htm.

Slender salamanders
Salamander
Salamander
Fauna of the California chaparral and woodlands
San Gabriel Mountains
Angeles National Forest
Natural history of Los Angeles County, California